The Romanian National Road Race Championships are held annually to decide the cycling champions in both road race discipline, across various categories.

Men

Under-23

Women

See also
Romanian National Time Trial Championships
National Road Cycling Championships

References

National road cycling championships
Cycle races in Romania